Hilary Roberta Bollan CSci CChem FRSC MBE is a retired chemist who was a senior scientific officer at the British Ministry of Defence. Her work focused on safety on submarines.

Early life and education 
Hilary Bollan (née Bell) was born in Bridgwater, Somerset. She obtained her PhD from Sheffield Hallam University under the direction of Professor Michael Cooke. For her thesis project, she investigated real-time monitoring method of ammonia, hydrazines, and nitrogen dioxide below exposure limit, using ion mobility spectrometry with ketones as dopant. Her thesis research was conducted primarily at the Bridgwater Laboratories of the Defence and Evaluation Research Agency, and partly in the laboratory of Gary A. Eiceman at the New Mexico State University.

Career and research 
Bollan's research focused on improving the safety of submarines, from sampling and monitoring air quality  to monitoring the chemicals which precede electrical fires.

Bollan served as an editor of the International Journal for Ion Mobility Spectrometry. She was the president of the International Society for Ion Mobility Spectrometry (2007-2008, 2013–2015). She organized the Annual Conference of the International Society for Ion Mobility Spectrometry in 1999 (Buxton, England) and in 2011 (Edinburgh, Scotland).

Honours 
Bollan is a Chartered Scientist, Chartered Chemist, and a Fellow of the Royal Society of Chemistry. She was appointed MBE (Member of the Most Excellent Order of the British Empire) for her "services to submarine safety and the Royal Navy" in the 2017 New Year Honours.

References 

Wikipedia Student Program
British women chemists
20th-century British women scientists
21st-century British women scientists
Alumni of Sheffield Hallam University
Members of the Order of the British Empire
Living people
Year of birth missing (living people)